East Kilbride railway station serves the town of East Kilbride, South Lanarkshire, Scotland. The station is managed by ScotRail and it is a terminus on the former Busby Railway.

Early history
Initially opened in 1868, and operated by the Caledonian Railway Company from Glasgow via Busby which was a spur from the Glasgow to Barrhead railway at Pollokshaws, the line was extended eastwards in 1888 to Hunthill Junction, near High Blantyre, with an intermediate halt at Calderwood Glen.

At Hunthill was a triangular junction where the line from Strathaven joined, then the line proceeded towards Auchinraith Junction where it joined the current Hamiton – Blantyre section of line. This extension of the line was never busy and traffic was suspended during the 1914–18 war, with complete closure coming about as a consequence of the 1939–45 war, after which the line was cut back to Nerston where it serviced some local industries such as Mavor and Coulson Mining Equipment.

The section immediately beyond East Kilbride station was also used for many years for shunting etc., and photographs exist of a derailment of a locomotive in this section in 1951. The section between Busby and East Kilbride has always been a single line and was worked by a token arrangement until the resignalling of the East Kilbride Line on 24 February 1974.

1966

The section from Nerston to the current station was closed on 24 January 1966, shortly before the last steam-hauled passenger services ceased in March of that year. Some of the track beyond East Kilbride was in situ until the early 1970s although not in use; photographs as late as 1972 show an overbridge at West Mains Road and the line continuing underneath.

The course of the former railway is built on immediately beyond the station; however, the route can be easily followed towards Nerston and beyond. The line is in fact a footpath between Main Street and East Mains Road and to this day is still easily recognisable as a former railway. The former viaduct at High Blantyre is long gone but the piers are still easily visible. Beyond High Blantyre the route is completely replaced by housing but is still possible to follow with a careful eye on Google Maps.

Despite the postwar development of East Kilbride as a New town development, serious consideration was given to the closure of the line following the 'Beeching Report'. However, a concerted effort by the Glasgow-East Kilbride Railway Development Association in the late 1960s secured the line's survival into the present era.

Present era

Goods traffic, latterly domestic coal for Kanes, based in the old goods yard, survived until 1983-4 although the yard itself was not dismantled until the winter of 1988–9, after which the land was sold and redeveloped as private flats. The Caledonian goods shed survived the loss of general freight in the late 1960s and was occupied by scrap merchants until about 1990, then being demolished during redevelopment of the site.

The station is considered to be poorly positioned for modern uses, as it is built near the heart of the old village of East Kilbride, and only partly serves the large new area that has grown since it opened. Since the 1970s, there have been a number of plans to extend the line to East Kilbride Shopping Centre and the bus station; however, none of these have ever come to fruition, primarily due to the cost of any such project and the difficulty in the steep and densely built over terrain between the current station and the centre. The last such proposal in 1989, which involved tunnelling beneath the area around the Civic Centre to reach the new (1986) bus station, was defeated by protests from local 'NIMBY' interests.

British Rail & SPTE also published plans in the early 1980s to re-route services west of  onto the Neilston branch of the Cathcart Circle Lines using a short-lived connection between the two routes first laid in 1903.  This would have brought overhead electrification to the branch and seen trains run via  and Cathcart to Glasgow, but also seen Giffnock & Thornliebank stations closed (along with the section of line between Clarkston & Busby Junction).  The proposals proved unpopular and were not implemented.

Previously, additional peak hour services were provided by additional trains which shunted from the siding at East Kilbride, although this fell into disuse after the half hourly service was introduced and was dismantled and lifted in 2005.

The once quite extensive infrastructure that existed at East Kilbride is no more and only a single line to the buffer stop now exists. There is room available for future expansion to two platforms should the need arise, particularly with electrification planned in the medium term by the Scottish Government.

The station hosts a ticket kiosk that is open most of the hours that trains run to and from the station, as well as a small News Kiosk shop.

Services

There is a daily half-hourly service (including Sundays) north-west to Glasgow Central with extra journeys during weekday peak periods. The average journey time to Glasgow Central is 30 minutes. The earliest train leaving the station is at 06:18 Monday to Friday, and 08:26 on Sundays. The last train to arrive at the station is at 23:50.

References

Bibliography

External links

Video footage of East Kilbride railway station in 2022.

Railway stations in South Lanarkshire
SPT railway stations
Railway stations served by ScotRail
Buildings and structures in East Kilbride
Railway stations in Great Britain opened in 1868
Former Caledonian Railway stations
1868 establishments in Scotland